Tim Sebastian (born 17 January 1984) is a German former professional footballer who played as a defender. He has made various appearances for German youth national teams.

Career

Hansa Rostock
Sebastian grew up playing in the Motor Wolgast youth system before joining Greifswalder SC in 1996. In 1999, he received an offer from FC Hansa Rostock and joined the club's youth system. On 7 November 2004, Sebastian made his debut in the Bundesliga, being named to the starting line-up by manager Juri Schlünz against VfB Stuttgart. He scored his first goal in the Bundesliga on 30 April 2005 in a 2–1 victory over Hertha BSC. In his first season with the first team he appeared in eight league games as Hansa was relegated to 2. Bundesliga at the end of the season.

Sebastian remained a key player at the club for the next few seasons and helped the club gain promotion back to the Bundesliga during the 2006–07 season. After featuring in 31 games in the top flight for Hansa during the 2007–08 season, Sebastian moved to Karlsruher SC on a free transfer. He remained at Karlsruhe for one season, appearing in 19 matches and scoring one goal, before returning the following season to Rostock.

RB Leipzig
In 2010, Sebastian returned to his hometown, joining RB Leipzig on a four-year contract and being immediately appointed captain. On 6 August 2010, Sebastian made his debut for RB Leipzig in a 1–1 draw with Türkiyemspor Berlin. He appeared in 27 league matches in his first season scoring one goal as the club finished its first season in the Regionalliga in fourth place, thus missing out on promotion. However, under coach Tomas Oral, the club succeeded in winning the 2010–11 Saxony Cup after defeating Chemnitzer FC 1–0 in the final on 1 June 2011 in front of 13,958 spectators at the Red Bull Arena. By winning the 2010–11 Saxony cup, the club won its first title in club history. It also qualified to participate in the 2011–12 DFB-Pokal. For the following seasons he was a key contributor in helping the club gain promotion from Regionalliga Nordost all the way up to the 2. Bundesliga. He extended his contract at RB Leipzig on 4 April 2014 for another year until 2015, with a possibility for another year of extension.

SC Paderborn
He moved to SC Paderborn on 14 January 2016.

References

External links

bundesliga.de

1984 births
Living people
Footballers from Leipzig
German footballers
Germany youth international footballers
FC Hansa Rostock players
Karlsruher SC players
RB Leipzig players
SC Paderborn 07 players
Bundesliga players
2. Bundesliga players
3. Liga players
Association football defenders